The Andrew Lloyd Webber Collection is a 1997 compilation album by classical crossover soprano Sarah Brightman. All of the tracks on this album are previously available on other albums.
It is Brightman's third best-selling release in the United States.

Track listing

Chart performance
The album debuted at the Billboard Top 200 Albums at No. 110 and remained 17 weeks on chart. It peaked at the Billboard Top Classical Crossover Albums at No. 2.

In April 2008, after Andrew Lloyd Webber appeared at the seventh season of the American show American Idol, and supplemented by a featured appearance of the record at the iTunes music store, the album peaked to No. 1 at the store's Top 100 Vocal albums.

Charts and certifications

charts

Certifications

References

Sarah Brightman albums
1997 compilation albums
Albums produced by Andrew Lloyd Webber
Albums produced by Nigel Wright